Jacques Jouanneau (3 October 1926 – 19 July 2011) was a French actor. He was born in Angers, France.

Biography

Filmography 

1953: Capitaine Pantoufle - Le barman du Goéland (uncredited)
1954: Les Intrigantes - Le Reporter (uncredited)
1954: Ah! Les belles bacchantes - Joseph Delmar, le régisseur aux Folies-Méricourt
1954: One Step to Eternity - Le flic
1955: French Canacan - Bidon
1955: Madonna of the Sleeping Cars - Henri - le chauffeur
1955: Les Grandes manœuvres - L'ordonnance de Félix
1956: The Road to Paradise - Robert
1956: Elena et les hommes - Eugène Martin-Michaud
1956: En effeuillant la marguerite - Edouard, friend of Daniel
1956: Paris, Palace Hôtel - Le laquais de l'entrée
1957: Le Colonel est de la revue - Van Molpen
1957: Let's Be Daring, Madame - Dédé la Matraque
1957: Comme un cheveu sur la soupe - Amédée
1957: Love Is at Stake - Damiano
1958:  (Le Tombeur) - Edouard "Doudou" Doucin
1958: Life Together - Sentis, généalogiste
1958: Madame et son auto - Jean Moulin
1958: Suivez-moi jeune homme - Chatou
1959:  - Édgar / Léon
1959: Un témoin dans la ville - Man renting a car to Ancelin
1960: Les Distractions (The Distractions) - Maxime
1961: Ôtez votre fille s'il vous plaît (TV Movie) - Colardeau
1961: Napoleon II, the Eagle - Esterhazy
1961: Les Chiuchachas (Short)
1962: Le Caporal épinglé - Penche A Gauche
1963: Judex - Alfred Cocantin
1963: Un coup dans l'aile (TV Movie) - Manouille
1964: Les Pieds nickelés - Vergadin
1964: Patate - Marcel
1965: L'Or du duc (The Gold of the Duke) - Le casseur d'autos
1967: Astérix le Gaulois - Assurancetourix (voice)
1968: Six chevaux bleus (TV Series)
1968: Pour un amour lointain - Adrien
1969: Le Champion du tiercé (Les Gros malins) - Paul Blanc
1969: Tintin et le temple du soleil - (voice)
1970: Domicile conjugal - Césarin
1970: Les Novices - The Mona Lisa client
1971: Le Misanthrope (TV Movie) - Dubois
1971: Un enfant dans la ville (TV Movie)
1971: Daisy Town - Jack Dalton (voice)
1971: Les Pétroleuses - Mons. Letellier
1974: Le Permis de conduire - Bastien
1974: La Grande nouba - TV reporter
1974: Deux grandes filles dans un pyjama - Lionel
1974: Par ici la monnaie - Fauxpied
1976: René la Canne - Fourgue
1976: Larguez les amarres! (TV Movie) - Félicien
1977: Le Maestro (The Maestro) - immobilized agent
1977: Parisian Life - Alfred
1978: Les Bidasses au pensionnat - L'adjudant
1978: Messieurs les ronds de cuir (TV Movie) - Boudin
1979: Le Cavaleur - Le quincaillier
1979: Par devant notaire (TV Movie) - Jacques (segment "Résidence du bonheur, La")
1979:  - Manuel Orlandi
1981: Celles qu'on n'a pas eues - Le mari de la morte
1983: Le Retour des bidasses en folie - The general of Lastra
1984: Le Cowboy (The Cowboy) - The minister
1984: Emmenez-moi au théâtre (TV Series) - Auguste
1987: Lily et Lily (Lily and Lily) (TV Movie) - Sam
1988: Chouans! - Blaise
1991: Triplex - Frank's father
1991: Les Clés du paradis - The president of the yacht club
1992: Room Service - The viscount Louis
1992: Prêcheur en eau trouble (TV Movie) - Dr Martel
1992: Tout ou presque (TV Movie)
1996: Fallait pas !... - Constance's Father (final film role)

External links

1926 births
2011 deaths
People from Angers
French male film actors
French male television actors